Christian Spanne (born 22 June 1986) is a Norwegian handball player. He played 36 matches for the Norway men's national handball team between 2005 and 2012.  He participated at the 2009 World Men's Handball Championship, where the Norwegian team placed 9th.

References

External links

1986 births
Living people
Norwegian male handball players
Expatriate handball players
Norwegian expatriate sportspeople in Poland
Sportspeople from Drammen